Arthroleptis variabilis is a species of frog in the family Arthroleptidae. It is found in the lowlands of eastern Nigeria, Cameroon, Equatorial Guinea (including the island of Bioko), Gabon, the Central African Republic, the Republic of the Congo, and the Democratic Republic of the Congo. Earlier records west from Nigeria refer to other species, including Arthroleptis krokosua described in 2008. Common names Buea screeching frog and variable squeaker frog have been coined for it.

Etymology
The specific name variabilis is Latin for "changeable". This presumably refers to the wide range of coloration and pattern seen in the species.

Description
Arthroleptis variabilis is a robust frog with moderately robust limbs. Males measure  and females  in snout–vent length. The head is somewhat broad. The tympanum is distinct and ovoid. The fingers and toes do not have webbing but there is a very prominent, flange-like inner metatarsal tubercle. Skin is smooth but tending towards glandular posteriorly and is glandular laterally. Coloration is variable. Dorsal base coloration is black, dark gray,  brown (dark, light, or ruddy), red, or olive green. Markings on dorsal and lateral surfaces range from tan, orange, light or dark brown to black, When present, mid-vertebral stripe is gray to orange. Ventral surface of throat is generally dark gray to black with white or creamy stripe along midline. The venter is white or gray with light- to dark-gray spots. The inguinal region is from pale yellow to orange red.

Habitat and conservation
It lives among leaf litter and can be locally abundant. It is probably threatened by habitat loss, but occurs in a number of protected areas.

References

variabilis
Frogs of Africa
Amphibians of West Africa
Amphibians of Cameroon
Amphibians of the Central African Republic
Amphibians of the Democratic Republic of the Congo
Amphibians of Equatorial Guinea
Amphibians of Gabon
Fauna of Nigeria
Amphibians of the Republic of the Congo
Taxa named by Paul Matschie
Amphibians described in 1893
Taxonomy articles created by Polbot